James Lukram Singh (born 1 March 1981 in Imphal) is an Indian football player who plays as a winger for United Sikkim F.C.

International career
Singh made his international debut for India national team on 16 October 2003, against Thailand in a friendly match. Between 2003 and 2006, he has appeared in 28 matches for his country, scoring 3 goals.

Honours

India
SAFF Championship: 2005

Manipur
Santosh Trophy: 2002–03

References

External links
 
 Profile at Goal.com
 

Indian footballers
1981 births
Living people
People from Imphal
Footballers from Manipur
I-League players
Mohun Bagan AC players
Mahindra United FC players
Salgaocar FC players
United SC players
United Sikkim F.C. players
India international footballers
Association football wingers
Bengal Mumbai FC players